The Coast Guard Aviation Association, formerly known as the Ancient Order of the Pterodactyl (AOP) is a fraternal association founded in 1977. The organization has the purpose of focusing on United States Coast Guard aviation history. On 5 May 2007, the organization was renamed the Coast Guard Aviation Association.

Membership is for former and present officers and enlisted personnel of the United States Coast Guard, and designated pilots of other military services and foreign governments who have piloted Coast Guard aircraft while involved in exchange programs between the Coast Guard and their respective service or government.

Its goals include furthering and preserving the history of Coast Guard aviation and maintaining camaraderie between past and present Coast Guardsmen. The Coast Guard Aviation Association is headquartered in Chantilly, Virginia.

Activities
The Order hosts an annual gathering known as the "Roost". A Roost is normally anchored by a Coast Guard Air Station.

List of past Roost locations:
 1977    Long Beach, CA
 1978    San Francisco, CA
 1979    San Francisco, CA
 1980    Mobile, AL
 1981    Elizabeth City, NC
 1982    Traverse City, MI
 1983    San Diego, CA
 1984    Mobile, AL
 1985    Washington, D.C.
 1986    Corpus Christi, TX
 1987    Port Angeles, WA
 1988    New Orleans, LA
 1989    Elizabeth City, NC	
 1990    Oshkosh, WI
 1991    Pensacola, FL
 1992    Astoria, OR
 1993    Clearwater, FL
 1994    Traverse City, MI
 1995    San Diego, CA
 1996    Cape Cod, MA
 1997    NAS Pensacola, FL
 1998    Colorado Springs, CO
 1999    Atlantic City, NJ
 2000    Seattle, WA (Boeing Air Museum)
 2001    Miami, FL
 2002    Mobile, AL
 2003    Elizabeth City, NC
 2004    Sacramento, CA
 2005    Savannah, GA
 2006    Traverse City, MI
 2007    Washington, DC
 2008    Astoria, OR
 2009    Elizabeth City, NC
 2010    Jacksonville, FL
 2011    Mobile, AL
 2012    Sacramento, CA
 2013    Washington, DC
 2014    Cape Cod, MA
 2015    San Diego, CA
 2016    Mobile, AL
 2017    Atlantic City, NJ
 2018    Traverse City, MI

References

External links

1977 establishments in Virginia
United States Coast Guard Aviation
Service organizations based in the United States
History of the United States Coast Guard
Non-profit organizations based in Chantilly, Virginia
United States military associations